LiteFoot ATV rubber track is a track conversion system for ATVs manufactured by Mattracks Inc. Tracks are bolted in place of tires. Mattracks launched the LiteFoot ATV track conversion systems in 2002, adding to the Mattracks rubber track conversion product line up.

External links
LiteFoot Website
Mattracks Website

References

ATVs